George Owen Mackie   (born October 20, 1929) is a British–Canadian professor emeritus of biology at the University of Victoria. Prior to this, he worked at the University of Alberta Department of Zoology, which he left in 1968. Much of his research focussed on invertebrate behavioural physiology. He was born in Lincolnshire, England, on October 20, 1929, youngest son of Frederick Percival Mackie. After obtaining a B.A. from the University of Oxford in 1953, he obtained an M.A. and a D. Phil from Oxford in 1957. In 1982, he was made a fellow of the Royal Society of Canada. In 1991, he was made a fellow of the Royal Society of London.

Career 
Mackie worked on jellyfish and other marine invertebrates, exploring the role of excitable epithelia as signalling pathways and analysing the neuromuscular basis of behaviour. He and Robert Meech discovered axons in Aglantha that conduct two sorts of action potential: sodium-based in fast swimming, calcium-based in slow. With Sally Leys he found that hexactinellid sponges conduct electrical impulses throughout their bodies, regulating the activity of the flagella that produce the feeding current.

References 

Living people
Alumni of the University of Oxford
Academic staff of the University of Victoria
Canadian zoologists
Fellows of the Royal Society of Canada
Fellows of the Royal Society
1929 births
Canadian Fellows of the Royal Society